The Snakes of Europe is a book by the Belgian-British zoologist George Albert Boulenger, published in 1913, which is described in the author's preface as the first book written in English describing the snakes found in Europe.

References

British non-fiction books
1913 books
Reptiles of Europe
Zoology books